Hussein Al-Ghazi (born 7 May 1990) is a Yemeni footballer who plays as a midfielder.

International career

He made his international debut on January 20 2010, a 3-0 victory against Bahrain during the 2011 AFC Asian Cup qualification. He was selected to the Yemeni squad that played at the 2019 AFC Asian Cup.

References 

Yemeni footballers
Yemeni expatriate footballers
Yemen international footballers
1990 births
Living people
Al-Ahli Taizz SC players
Al-Shula players
Al-Saqr SC players
Al-Oruba (Yemeni) players
Al-Tilal SC players
Al-Bahri players
Al-Wakrah SC players
Yemeni expatriate sportspeople in Iraq
Yemeni expatriate sportspeople in Qatar
Expatriate footballers in Iraq
Expatriate footballers in Qatar
Yemeni League players
Qatari Second Division players
2019 AFC Asian Cup players

Association football midfielders